is a Japanese voice actor affiliated with Aoni Production. He is best known for his roles in Mobile Suit Victory Gundam as Üso Ewin, Gintama as Shinpachi Shimura, Clannad as Youhei Sunohara, Blood Blockade Battlefront as Leonardo Watch, Paprika as Kei Himuro, Atashinchi as Yuzuhiko Tachibana, Hyouka as Satoshi Fukube, Guilty Crown as Souta Tamadate, Persona 5 as Yuki Mishima, Paranoia Agent as Lil' Slugger, Ragnarok The Animation as Roan, God Eater as Kōta Fujiki, and Fire Force as Viktor Licht.

He was part of the voice actor unit E.M.U (Entertainment Music Unit) with fellow voice actors Hikaru Midorikawa, Hideo Ishikawa, Nobutoshi Hayashi and Ryōtarō Okiayu.

Filmography

Television animation
1992
Sailor Moon (Kyuusuke Sarashina, Neko)

1993
Mobile Suit Victory Gundam (Üso Ewin)
Ghost Sweeper Mikami (Male Student)

1994
Kiteretsu Daihyakka (Kiteretsu Kite (Young))
Ginga Sengoku Gun'yūden Rai (Toramaru)
Aoki Densetsu Shoot! (Kiyotaka Hirose)
Captain Tsubasa J (Yuzo Morisaki)
Marmalade Boy (Yamaguchi)

1995
Kyōryū Bōkenki Jura Tripper (Beso)
Sailor Moon S (Boy A, Young Man)
Dragon Ball Z (Obake)

1996
Ganbarist! Shun (Shun Fujimaki)
Sailor Moon Super S Special (Dummy)

1997
Crayon Shin-chan (Yoshirin Hatogaya)
Cooking Master Boy (Tan Sanche)
In The Beginning - The Bible Stories (Asaph)

1998
Gakkyu-oh Yamazaki (Hikaru Butada)
Kindaichi Shounen no Jikenbo (Channeler Sakuraba, Yōichi Takatō (Young))
Nazca (Keita Seino/Amaro)
Orphen (Killing Doll)
Mamotte Shugogetten (Tasuke Shichiri)
Yu-Gi-Oh! (Hamada Haiyama)
Yoiko (Kenji Amimoto)
Record of Lodoss War: Chronicles of the Heroic Knight (Marle)

1999
The Big O (Jeff Meyers)
Hoshin Engi (Taiitsu Shinjin)

2000
Ghost Stories (Reiichirou Miyanoshita (Young))

2001
Shingu: Secret of the Stellar Wars (Jirō Narita)
Super GALS! (Naoki Kuroi)
PaRappa the Rapper (Police Dog)
The Family's Defensive Alliance (Shoichi Masui)
Beyblade (Giancarlo)
Hajime no Ippo (Masahiko Umezawa, Naomichi Yamada)
Magical Meow Meow Taruto (Geppei Ogaki)

2002
Atashinchi (Yuzuhiko Tachibana)
Soreike! Anpanman (Hamigakiman)
Tokyo Mew Mew (Quiche)
Heat Guy J (Claire Leonelli)
Digimon Frontier (Trailmon)

2003
Astro Boy (Butch, Maru-chan)
Air Master (Reiichi Mishima)
The Twelve Kingdoms (Hakuchi, Suguru Takasato)
Tantei Gakuen Q (Masashi Tominaga)
The World of Narue (Kazuto Iizuka)
Pokémon Advance (Takeshi's Usohachi, Tom Pei)
Bobobo-bo Bo-bobo (Halon Oni, Youngest Dynamite Brother)
Maburaho (Kazuki Shikimori)

2004
Agatha Christie no Meitantei Poirot to Marple (Alex Crackenthorpe)
Mars Daybreak (Kato Takigawa, Jr.)
Croquette! (Pirozhki)
Hamtaro (Kitsune-san)
Fullmetal Alchemist (Man A)
Black Jack (Mitsuo)
Paranoia Agent (Shonen Bat, Makoto Kozuka)
Ragnarok The Animation (Roan)
Rockman EXE Stream (TomahawkMan)

2005
Air (TV Hero)
Aquarion (Jun Lee)
Suki na Mono wa Suki Dakara Shouganai!! (Hiromu Sakura)
Shinshaku Sengoku Eiyū Densetsu - Sanada Jū Yūshi The Animation (Chunagon Hideaki Kobayakawa)
Tide-Line Blue (Keel)
D.I.C.E. (Jet Siegel)
Major (Tokashiki)
MÄR (Jack)
Rockman EXE Beast (TomahawkMan)
One Piece (Rittonto)
Pocket Monsters: Advanced Generation (Takeshi's Usohachi)

2006
Welcome to the NHK (Kaoru Yamazaki)
Gintama (Shinpachi Shimura, Kobayashi)
Kiba (Ginga)
.hack//Roots (Silabus)
Bleach (Hou, Ban)
Pocket Monsters: Diamond & Pearl (Hajime, Satoshi's Fukamaru, Takeshi's Usohachi/Usokkie, Kojirou's Masukippa)
Rockman EXE Beast+ (TomahawkMan)
Yomigaeru Sora - RESCUE WINGS (Kotaro Kumata, Takefumi Inoue)

2007
Clannad (Youhei Sunohara)
Gegege no Kitarō (Tofu-Kozou, Kinkichi, Kobayashi)
Baccano! (Jacuzzi Splot)
Bamboo Blade (Yūji Nakata)
Bokurano (Takashi Waku)
Mokke (Arita)
Mononoke (Hyoue Sasaki)
Moyashimon (Tadayasu Sawaki)

2008
Kamen no Maid Guy (Kōsuke Fujiwara)
Clannad After Story (Youhei Sunohara)
Linebarrels of Iron (Riku Ousei)
Golgo 13 (Steve)
Antique Bakery (Young Man A)
The Telepathy Girl Ran (Yamashita)
Sands of Destruction (Kumagoro)

2009
Chrome Shelled Regios (Harley Sutton)
Hell Girl: Three Vessels (Fumio Mizuhara)
Doraemon (Pilon)
Kaidan Restaurant (Hiroshi Itō)
Sgt. Frog (Chief)
Battle Spirits: Shōnen Gekiha Dan (Hideto Suzuri, Bodyguard 3)
Hajime no Ippo: New Challenger (Hammer Nao/Naomichi Yamada)
White Album (Akira Nanase)

2010
Katanagatari (Chouchou Maniwa)
Naruto Shippūden (Komushi, Samidare)
Heartcatch Precure! (Hideo Saitani)
One Piece (Portgas D. Ace (Young))

2011
The Idolmaster (Host)
Guilty Crown (Sōta Tamadate)
Gintama' (Shinpachi Shimura, Teppei Sugihara)
Sket Dance (Shinpachi Shimura, Teppei Sugihara)
Chihayafuru (Futoshi Mochida)
Battle Spirits: Brave (Hideto Suzuri)
Detective Conan (Yoshinari Hashimoto)

2012
EUREKA SEVEN AO (Salesman)
The Knight in the Area (Ichirō Yamanashi)
Mobile Suit Gundam AGE (Max Hartway)
Smile Precure! (Pop)
Battle Spirits: Sword Eyes (Suō)
Hyouka (Satoshi Fukube)
Pretty Rhythm: Dear My Future (Yū Hirōmi)
Moyashimon Returns (Tadayasu Sawaki)

2013
Senyū. Dai 2 Ki (Juli)
Tanken Driland (Evil Calvary God Seado, Kamikaze Kassim)
Danball Senki Wars (Celede Chrysler)
Chihayafuru 2 (Futoshi Mochida)
Namiuchigiwa no Muromi-san (Giant Oarfish)
Naruto Shippuden (Komushi)

2014
Amagi Brilliant Park (Kimura)
Kamigami no Asobi: Ludere deorum (Zeus Keraunos (child))
Shōnen Hollywood - Holly Stage for 49 (Minoru Tomii)
Hamatora (Yuuki Katsuragi)
Hero Bank (Masahiro Mikeda)

2015
Gintama° (Shinpachi Shimura)
Amagi Brilliant Park (Kimura)
Blood Blockade Battlefront (Leonardo Watch)
God Eater (Kōta Fujiki)
Shōnen Hollywood - Holly Stage for 50 (Minoru Tomii)
Shin ATASHIn'CHI (Yuzuhiko Tachibana)
Battle Spirits Burning Soul (Norihide Kongo)
Sailor Moon Crystal (Ittou Asanuma)

2016
Myriad Colors Phantom World (Shosuke Morohashi)
Puzzle & Dragons X (Donny)
Digimon Universe: Appli Monsters (Hackmon)

2017
Gintama. (Shinpachi Shimura)
Clean Freak! Aoyama kun (Jin Tsukamoto)
Blood Blockade Battlefront & Beyond (Leonardo Watch)
March Comes in Like a Lion (Okuyasu Yokomizo)
Inuyashiki (Satoru Hamada)
Knight's & Magic (Tsubasa Kurata)

2018
The Disastrous Life of Saiki K. (Shinpachi Shimura (cameo), Fudekichi Shiragami)
Gintama. Shirogane no Tamashi-hen (Shinpachi Shimura)
Persona 5: The Animation (Yuki Mishima)
Mr. Tonegawa: Middle Management Blues (Keiichiro)

2019
JoJo's Bizarre Adventure: Golden Wind (Carne / Notorious B.I.G)
RobiHachi (JPS-19)
Fire Force (Victor Licht)

2020
If My Favorite Pop Idol Made It to the Budokan, I Would Die (Fujikawa)
Fire Force (season 2) (Victor Licht)

2021
Ex-Arm (Beta)
Motto! Majime ni Fumajime Kaiketsu Zorori (Gramo)
Digimon Ghost Game (Kotarou Nomura)
Kaginado (Youhei Sunohara)
2022

 Auto Boy - Carl from Mobile Land (Dorobon)
 Urusei Yatsura (Akira)
 Ao Ashi (Aki Tsukishima)
 Duel Masters WIN (Unchiku)
 Reincarnated as a Sword (Dungeon Master)

Theatrical animation
1997
Noiseman Sound Insect (Susumu)

1999
Crayon Shin-chan: Explosion! The Hot Spring's Feel Good Final Battle (Yoshirin)

2000
Crayon Shin-chan: Jungle That Invites Storm (Yoshirin)

2002
A Tree of Palme (Shatta)

2003
Crayon Shin-chan: Fierceness That Invites Storm! Yakiniku Road of Honor (Yoshirin)
Atashinchi the Movie (Yuzuhiko Tachibana)

2005
Pokémon: Lucario and the Mystery of Mew (Weavile)
Rockman EXE Hikari to Yami no Program (TomahawkMan)
One Piece: Baron Omatsuri and the Secret Island (Rick)

2006
Crayon Shin-chan: The Legend Called: Dance! Amigo! (Yoshirin)
Pocket Monsters Advanced Generation the Movie - Pokémon Ranger and the Prince of the Sea: Manaphy (Tamanta, Buoysel)
Paprika (2006) (Kei Himuro)

2007
Genesis of Aquarion: Wings of Genesis (Jun Lee)
Clannad The Movie (Youhei Sunohara)
Pocket Monsters Diamond & Pearl the Movie - Dialga VS Palkia VS Darkrai (Takeshi's Usokkie, Tonio (young))

2008
Tamagotchi: Happiest Story in the Universe! (Happy)
Pocket Monsters Diamond & Pearl the Movie - Giratina and the Sky's Bouquet: Shaymin (Takeshi's Usokkie)

2009
Space Battleship Yamato: Resurrection (Sho and So Tenma)
Pocket Monsters Diamond & Pearl the Movie - Arceus: To a Conquering Spacetime (Takeshi's Usokkie)

2010
Gintama The Movie: Shinyaku Benizakura-hen (Shinpachi Shimura)
Pocket Monsters Diamond & Pearl the Movie - Supreme Ruler of Illusions: Zoroark (Takeshi's Usokkie, Kuruto's Bronzor)
Atashinchi 3D  (Yuzuhiko Tachibana)

2012
Ashura (Kure)
Crayon Shin-chan: Fierceness That Invites Storm! Me and the Space Princess (Yoshirin)

2013
Pretty Cure All Stars NewStage2 Friends of the Heart (Pop)
Crayon Shin-chan: Very Tasty! B-class Gourmet Survival!!(Yoshirin)
Gintama The Movie: The Final Chapter: Be Forever Yorozuya (Shinpachi Shimura)

2015
Crayon Shin-chan: My Moving Story! Cactus Large Attack! (Yoshirin)

2016
Crayon Shin-chan: Fast Asleep! The Great Assault on Dreamy World! (Yoshirin)
Yowamushi Pedal Spare Bike (Shunsaku Itokawa)

2018
Crayon Shin-chan: Burst Serving! Kung Fu Boys ~Ramen Rebellion~ (Yoshirin)

2019
Bakutsuri Bar Hunter Movie: Nazo no Barcode Trial! Bakutsure! Shinkaigyo Poseidon (Tonpei Tachtute)

2021
Gintama The Final (Shinpachi Shimura)
2022

 Kaiketsu Zorori: Lalala♪ Star Tanjō (Chun-kun)

OVA/ONA
1999
Sotsugyou M: Ore-tachi no Carnival (Mikimaro Shimura)

2000
Denshin Mamotte Shugogetten (Tasuke Shichiri)

2002
6 Angels (Akira Canyon)
Ichi the Killer 1 THE ANIMATION EPISODE 0 (Hirose)
Psychic Academy (Ai Shiomi)

2003
Submarine 707R (Senta Umino)

2005
Gintama jump festa 2005 (Shinpachi Shimura)

2007
Genesis of Aquarion (Jun Lee)
.hack // GU Returner (Silabus)
Fist of the North Star 2: Legend of Yuria (Ryuga) 

2009
Tokimeki Memorial 4 Original Animation: Hajimari no Finder (Manabu Kobayashi)

2010
Agukaru (Mellorine)

2011
VitaminX Addiction (Masaki Sanada)

2012
Detective Conan: The Miracle of Excalibur (Fujio)

2013
Transformers Go! (Hishoumaru)

2016
Blood Blockade Battlefront (Leonardo Watch) (2 OVA 2016-2018)
Gintama°: Love Incense Arc (Shinpachi Shimura)

2019
7SEEDS (Sakuya Yamaki)
Battle Spirits Saga Brave (Hideto Suzuri)
Gintama: Monster Strike-hen (Shinpachi Shimura)

2021
Gintama: The Semi-final (Shinpachi Shimura)

Video games
.hack//G.U. (Silabus)
Airforce Delta Strike (Pierre Gallo)
Atelier Annie: Alchemists of Sera Island (Kyle Eugrald)
Battle Arena Toshinden (Fang)
Battle Fantasia (Cedric Ward)
Cosmic Break (Jikun Hu, Hot Blooded Hero)
CV: Casting Voice (Toru Saotome)
Dragon Ball Heroes (Saiyan Avatar [Elite Type])
Dynasty Warriors 8 (Zhang Bao)
Gintama DS: Yorozuya Riot (Shinpachi Shimura)
Gintama: Gintoki vs. Hijikata!? The Kabuki District Silver Ball Competition!! (Shinpachi Shimura)
Gintama Rumble (Shinpachi Shimura)
Gintama: Silver Ball Quest: Gin-san Changes His Job and Saves the World (Shinpachi Shimura)
Gintama Sugoroku (Shinpachi Shimura)
Gintama: With Gin-san! My Kabuki District Diary (Shinpachi Shimura)
Gintama: Yorozuya Tu~be! Tsukkomable Video (Shinpachi Shimura)
God Eater series (Kouta Fujiki)
Gunparade March (Daisuke Akane)
JoJo's Bizarre Adventure: Phantom Blood (Poco)
J-Stars Victory Vs (Shinpachi Shimura)
Kessen (Tokugawa Hidetada)
Lunar: Silver Star Story (Nash)
Mobile Suit Gundam: Gundam vs. Gundam (Üso Ewin)
Money Puzzle Exchanger (Bill Bank / Coquetrybouncer)
Ore no Shita de Agake (Shin Shimizu)
Persona 5 (Yuki Mishima)
Soshite Bokura Wa, (Koki Kurisu)
SpellDown, (Yousuke Ohtani)
Star Fox 64 (NUS, Andrew Oikonny, Bill Grey)
Star Ocean: The Second Story (Ashton Anchors and Noel Chandler)
Super Dragon Ball Heroes World Mission (Saiyan elite type)
Super Robot Wars X-Ω (Uso Ewin)
Super Smash Bros. Brawl (Usohachi)
Tales of Symphonia (Gnome)
Tales of the World: Radiant Mythology (Mormo)
Tokimeki Memorial 4 (Manabu Kobayashi)
Tomoyo After: It's a Wonderful Life (Youhei Sunohara)
True Love Story 2 (Kenta Kazama)
Valkyrie Profile: Lenneth (Rouly)
VitaminX Evolution (Masaki Sanada)
Xenoblade Chronicles X (Tatsu)

Tokusatsu
Hyakujuu Sentai Gaoranger (2001) (Human body Specimen Org) (ep. 21)
Moero!! Robocon (1999) (Robokero)
Ressha Sentai ToQger (2014) (Keeper Knight) (ep. 37)
Kikai Sentai Zenkaiger (2021) (Omikuji Wald)

Drama CDs
Abunai series 3: Abunai Bara to Yuri no Sono
Abunai series 4: Abunai Campus Love (Yuu Kasai)
Aitsu no Daihonmei (Yoshio Yoshida)
Nijuurasen series (Yuuta Shinomiya)
Ourin Gakuen series 2: Ai no Sainou (Junya Shiraishi)
Princess Princess (Akira Sakamoto)

Japanese Voice-Over
Splash Mountain (Br'er Vulture 2) -->

Live-action roles
Death Note: New Generation (2016) (voice of Near)

Dubbing roles

Live-action
American Reunion, Kevin Myers (Thomas Ian Nicholas)
Free Willy 2 (Jesse)
Funky Monkey, Michael Dean (Seth Adkins)
 H2O: Just Add Water (Lewis McCartney)
Malèna, Renato Amoroso
Shazam!, Freddy Freeman (Jack Dylan Grazer)
Shazam! Fury of the Gods, Freddy Freeman (Jack Dylan Grazer)
Superbad, Fogell / McLovin (Christopher Mintz-Plasse)
Unaccompanied Minors, Spencer Davenport (Dyllan Christopher)

Animation
 Babar (TV series) (Young Arthur)Dragon Tales (1999-2006) (Zak)Drawn Together (2004-2007) (Xandir P. Wifflebottom)Sabrina: The Animated Series (Harvey Kinkle)
 Shirt Tales (Figby from "Figby the Spoiled Brat Cat")
 South Park (Stan Marsh (FOX dub) (Trey Parker))
 Teen Titans'' (Larry/Nosyarg Kcid (Dee Bradley Baker))

References

External links
 
Daisuke Sakaguchi at Ryu's Seiyuu Info
 

1973 births
20th-century Japanese male actors
21st-century Japanese male actors
Living people
Male voice actors from Niigata Prefecture
Japanese male video game actors
Japanese male voice actors
Aoni Production voice actors